Imamul Hai Khan Law College is a private law school situated at Nagarbhavi in Bokaro Steel City in the Indian state of Jharkhand. The college offers five-years integrated LL.B., and LL.M. course approved by the Bar Council of India (BCI), New Delhi and affiliated to Vinoba Bhave University of Hazaribag.

History 
This college was established by Imamul Hai Khan Educational Society in 1983 under the notification of the National Law School of India University Act.

References

Law schools in Jharkhand
Universities and colleges in Jharkhand
Educational institutions established in 1983
1983 establishments in Bihar
Colleges affiliated to Vinoba Bhave University